The 2003 Coca-Cola Tigers season was the second season of the franchise in the Philippine Basketball Association (PBA).

Draft picks

Championship (Finals stint)
The Coca-Cola Tigers played in the finals in all three conferences of the league's 29th season. In the All-Filipino Cup, the defending champions blew a 2–0 series lead in the best-of-seven championship against Talk 'N Text Phone Pals and lost in six games. Coca-Cola placed runner-up for the second straight conference when they lost to Alaska in the best-of-three finals series of the short Invitational championship.

Coca-Cola didn't end up bridesmaid for the third time in the season by winning over San Miguel Beermen in the season-ending Reinforced Conference. The Tigers defeated the Beermen in the deciding seventh game as coach Chot Reyes won his second title for Coca-Cola and fourth overall in his coaching career.

Award
Artemus McClary was voted the Reinforced Conference Best Import.

Roster

Game results

All-Filipino Cup

References

Powerade Tigers seasons
Coca